Lijia  is a station on Line 6 of Chongqing Rail Transit in Chongqing Municipality, China, which opened in 2012. It is located in Yubei District.

Station structure
A cross-platform interchange is provided between Line 6 main line and International Expo branch.

References

Yubei District
Railway stations in Chongqing
Railway stations in China opened in 2012
Chongqing Rail Transit stations